2017 Emperor's Cup Final was the 97th final of the Emperor's Cup competition. The final was played at Saitama Stadium 2002 in Saitama on January 1, 2018. Cerezo Osaka won the championship.

Match details

See also
2017 Emperor's Cup

References

Emperor's Cup
2017 in Japanese football
Cerezo Osaka matches
Yokohama F. Marinos matches